The James Spullock Williamson House, also known as Merry Oaks, is a historic plantation house in the rural community of Sandy Ridge in Lowndes County, Alabama.  The one-story Greek Revival-style house was completed circa 1860.

The house was built for James Spullock Williamson, a planter and state legislator. He owned 98 slaves during this time. Williamson was a son of the first judge of the Lowndes County Court, Peter Williamson, who had emigrated from Wilkes County, Georgia around 1819.

James Spullock Williamson was elected to the Alabama House of Representatives for the 1857–58 session. He also served during the Alabama Constitutional Convention of 1861 that preceded the American Civil War. Williamson was killed in 1862, during the Battle of Glendale in Henrico County, Virginia.  He was serving as a captain in the 14th Regiment Alabama Infantry.

The house has remained the property of Williamson descendants since it was built.  It was added to the Alabama Register of Landmarks and Heritage on September 12, 1988, and to the National Register of Historic Places on January 5, 1989, due to its architectural significance.

References

National Register of Historic Places in Lowndes County, Alabama
Houses on the National Register of Historic Places in Alabama
Houses completed in 1860
Properties on the Alabama Register of Landmarks and Heritage
Houses in Lowndes County, Alabama
Greek Revival houses in Alabama
Plantation houses in Alabama